Nunez is a surname.

Nunez may also refer to:
 Núñez, Buenos Aires, a barrio of Buenos Aires, Argentina
 Nunez, Georgia, a town in Georgia, United States
 Nunez, Louisiana, an unincorporated community in Louisiana, United States
 Nunez River, a river in Guinea
 Nunez Point, a point on Takaki Promontory in Antarctica
 Nunez Peninsula, a peninsula on the south coast of South Georgia
 Cape Nuñez, a headland of Nunez Peninsula
 Nunez Community College, a college in  Chalmette, Louisiana

See also
 Mendez-Nuñez, Cavite, a municipality in the Philippines
 Rafael Núñez International Airport, an airport in Cartagena, Colombia
 Núñez i Navarro Hotels, a Spanish hotel chain